Musa Khail  is a village in Bhulath Tehsil in Kapurthala district of Punjab State, India. The village is administrated by a Sarpanch, who is an elected representative.

Demography 
According to the report published by Census India in 2011,Musa Khail has 109 houses with the total population of 435 persons of which 215 are male and 220 females. Literacy rate of Musa Khail is 71.94%, lower than the state average of 75.84%.  The population of children in the age group 0–6 years is 43 which is 9.89% of the total population.  Child sex ratio is approximately 955, higher than the state average of 846.

Population data 

As per census 2011, 118 people were engaged in work activities out of the total population of Musa Khail which includes 98 males and 20 females. According to census survey report 2011,  92.37% workers (Employment or Earning more than 6 Months) describe their work as main work and 7.63% workers are involved in Marginal activity providing livelihood for less than 6 months.

Caste 
The village has schedule caste (SC) constitutes 24.37% of total population of the village and it doesn't have any Schedule Tribe (ST) population.

References

List of cities near the village 
Bhulath
Kapurthala 
Phagwara 
Sultanpur Lodhi

Air travel connectivity 
The closest International airport to the village is Sri Guru Ram Dass Jee International Airport.

External links
 Villages in Kapurthala
 List of Villages in Kapurthala Tehsil

Villages in Kapurthala district